Operation Babylon may refer to:

 An alternative name for Operation Opera, an Israeli bombing raid on Iraqi nuclear installations
 A 2015 Italian raid on a darknet market

See also
 Operation Ancient Babylon (2003–2006), the code name given to the deployment of Italian forces during the Iraq War